Merle Feld (born in 1947) is an educator, activist, author, playwright, and poet.

Biography
Merle Feld was born and raised in Brooklyn, New York. In 1968 she graduated from Brooklyn College and moved to Boston, where she became involved with the newly founded Havurat Shalom, the community "often considered a flagship of the havurah movement." She began writing her first play, The Opening, in 1981, and in 1983 began work on her second, The Gates Are Closing. This play is often read in synagogues in preparation for the High Holidays. In 1984 she joined B'not Esh, a Jewish feminist community, and early on, during one of their annual retreats, shared her first poems.

In 1989, she went to Israel for a sabbatical, where she facilitated an all-female Israeli-Palestinian dialogue group on the West Bank, and demonstrated with Women in Black. This part of her life was the basis of her third play, Across the Jordan, which was included as part of the first anthology of female Jewish playwrights, Making a Scene (Syracuse University Press, 1997).

In 1999, she published a memoir, A Spiritual Life: A Jewish Feminist Journey, which has been translated into Russian and published in the former Soviet Union. A revised edition was published in 2007 as A Spiritual Life: Exploring the Heart and the Jewish Tradition.

In 2000, she was named a "Woman Who Dared" by the Jewish Women's Archive for her peace activism.

In 2005, she became the founding director of the Albin Rabbinic Writing Institute, mentoring rabbinical students and recently ordained rabbis across the denominations.

In 2011, she published a collection of poems, Finding Words. In 2023, she published Longing: Poems of a Life with CCAR Press.

She is married to Rabbi Edward Feld, and the two have a daughter, Lisa, and a son, Uri.

References

External links
 
 Text of "We All Stood Together," Merle Feld's most famous poem

1947 births
American women dramatists and playwrights
American women poets
Jewish American writers
Jewish feminists
Living people
20th-century American dramatists and playwrights
21st-century American dramatists and playwrights
20th-century American poets
21st-century American poets
20th-century American women writers
21st-century American women writers
Brooklyn College alumni
21st-century American Jews